Halichoeres burekae, the Mardi Gras wrasse, is a species of wrasse native to the Gulf of Mexico. The species was first described from the Flower Garden Banks National Marine Sanctuary, in the northwestern Gulf of Mexico, but has since been recorded in other areas of the southern Gulf of Mexico. Because it is a small species that feeds on plankton in the water column, it is likely a preferred prey for invasive Lionfish. It also has a very restricted range, and corresponding relatively small population, what resulted in this species being listed as Endangered in the IUCN Red List.

Etymology
The fish is named in honor of Joyce Burek.

References 

Fish described in 2007
Taxa named by Douglas C. Weaver
Taxa named by Luiz A. Rocha
Halichoeres